...Maybe This Time is a 1980 Australian feature film starring Bill Hunter, Mike Preston, Ken Shorter and Judy Morris. It was the first feature directed by Chris McGill.

It was the feature film debut of stage/TV actor Jill Perryman.

Plot
Fran, the assistant to university professor Paddy, is about to turn 30. She is having an affair with a married minister's aide, Stephen. She returns home to the country town she grew up in and has a fling with an old flame, Alan. She also begins sleeping with Paddy.

Cast
Judy Morris as Fran
Bill Hunter as Stephen
Mike Preston as Paddy
Jill Perryman as Mother
Ken Shorter as Alan
Michele Fawdon as Margo
Leonard Teale as Minister
Jude Kuring as Meredith
Rod Mullinar as Jack
Chris Haywood as Salesman
Lyndall Barbour as Miss Bates
Lorna Lesley as Suzy Williams

Production
Bob Ellis says it took him five years to get the film made and that it was turned down by Gillian Armstrong, Stephen Wallace, Tony Buckley, Donald Crombie, Ken Hannam, David Stevens and Brian Bell. He then re-wrote it and managed to persuade the New South Wales Film Corporation to back it, although the NSWFC were the ones who picked the producer and director. They also insisted that the lead be played by Judy Morris, Helen Morse or Wendy Hughes.

Ellis later complained that all references in the script to Gough Whitlam had to be cut out of the first third of the film because the New South Wales Film Corporation was not seen to be biased towards Whitlam. He thought this destroyed the structure of the scenes and "as a result, the first 10 minutes of the film was wrecked, and the film will lose money."

Ellis says that the part played by Mike Preston was written for Jack Thompson and felt Judy Morris was miscast because she "looks too beautiful to have these problems, and the correct choice would have been somebody like Anna Volska or Michelle Fawdon." However he did like Morris' performance.

Morris later said of her character:
Fran is a woman who feels pushed into a corner. She is approaching 30, a time when many women being to feel their options are running out. She has passed through a sexual liberation stage but has found that this has not provided a solution. What she wants is a total commitment with a man.

The film was shot over six weeks starting in November 1979. Its original title was Letters from a Friend.

Release
The film was not a success at the box office. However the script by Bob Ellis and Anne Brooksbank won an AWGIE for best original feature film screenplay.

References

External links

Maybe This Time at TCMDB
Maybe This Time at Ozmovies

Australian drama films
1980 films
Films scored by Bruce Smeaton
1980s English-language films